The Bida Emirate is a traditional state in Nigeria, a successor to the old Nupe Kingdom, with its headquarters in Bida, Niger State. The head of the state is the Etsu Nupe, considered the leader of the Nupe people.

History

The old Nupe Kingdom was established in the middle of the 15th century in a basin between the Niger and Kaduna rivers in what is now central Nigeria. Early history is mostly based on verbally-transmitted legends.
King Jibiri, who reigned around 1770, was the first Nupe king to become Muslim. Etsu Ma’azu brought the kingdom to its period of greatest power, dying in 1818. During that period the Fulani were gaining power across Northern Nigeria. After Ma’azu's death and during the subsequent wars of succession the Nupe Kingdom came under the control of the Gwandu Emirate. Masaba, son of the Fulani leader Mallam Dendo and a Nupe mother, gained power in 1841.

Faced with revolt by one of his generals, Masaba allied with the former Etsu Nupe, Usman Zaki, to recover control. Usman Zaki was enthroned as Etsu Nupe at Bida, and after his death around 1859 Masaba again became ruler until 1873. During his second period of rule, Masaba established the Bida Emirate as an important military power, steadily expanding its territory at the expense of its neighbors to the south and east. His successors retained control until 1897, when British Niger Company troops finally took Bida and established a puppet ruler. The Bida emirate became subject first to the British colonial regime, then to the independent state of Nigeria, with its rulers playing an increasingly ceremonial role.

Till today now this emirate celebrates its cultural day known as Nupe Cultural Day, for the remembrance of the defeat to British rulers in their region.

Rulers
Rulers used the title "Etsu".

Names, dates and notes taken from John Stewart's African States and Rulers (1989).

Nupe Kingdom (1531-1835)

Nupe Emirate (1835-1901)

Bida Emirate (1901-

See also
:Category:Etsu Nupe

References

Niger State
Nigerian traditional states
Emirates
Nupe